Birmingham Yardley is a constituency of part of the city of Birmingham represented in the House of Commons of the UK Parliament since 2015 by Jess Phillips of the Labour Party.

Yardley Rural District was annexed to Birmingham under the 1911 Greater Birmingham Act.

Constituency profile
The seat covers south-eastern areas of Birmingham including Stechford, Tyseley, Yardley and Acocks Green. Electoral Calculus describes the seat as "Centrist", characterised by moderate views on social and economic issues.

Members of Parliament
From the seat's creation in 1918 until the 2005 general election, the MP elected for Birmingham Yardley was on all but three occasions a member of the party that won the general election, making it a former bellwether seat. Exceptions were Labour wins in the constituency compared to Conservative wins nationally in 1951, 1955 and 1992.

Boundaries

Yardley area committee district is coterminous with the seat which covers an area of the south-east of Birmingham with and on the boundaries of Solihull. It borders the parliamentary constituencies of Solihull, Meriden, Birmingham Hall Green and Birmingham Hodge Hill.

2010–present: The City of Birmingham wards of Acocks Green, Sheldon, South Yardley, and Stechford and Yardley North.

1983–2010: The City of Birmingham wards of Acocks Green, Sheldon, and Yardley.

1950–1983: The County Borough of Birmingham wards of Acocks Green, Sheldon, and Yardley.

1918–1950: The County Borough of Birmingham wards of Saltley, Small Heath, and Yardley.

Elections

Elections in the 2010s

Elections in the 2000s

Elections in the 1990s

Elections in the 1980s

Elections in the 1970s

Elections in the 1960s

Elections in the 1950s

Elections in the 1940s

Elections in the 1930s

Elections in the 1920s

Election in the 1910s

See also
List of parliamentary constituencies in the West Midlands (county)

Notes

References

External links 

 Birmingham city council constituency page

Parliamentary constituencies in Birmingham, West Midlands
Constituencies of the Parliament of the United Kingdom established in 1918